Emmanuel Hyacinth Babayaro (born 26 December 1976) is a Nigerian footballer. He is a goalkeeper, best known for being the older brother of former Chelsea and Newcastle United player Celestine Babayaro.

Emmanuel was a keen central midfielder as a child, but his younger brother Celestine would force him to play in goal, hitting him until he gave in. It was in this position that he was noticed.

Babayaro was also part of Nigeria's gold medal winning team at the 1996 Olympics, a side in which Celestine also appeared.

External links
NigerianPlayers.com profile

1976 births
Living people
Nigerian footballers
Nigerian expatriate footballers
Olympic footballers of Nigeria
Olympic gold medalists for Nigeria
Footballers at the 1996 Summer Olympics
Association football goalkeepers
Süper Lig players
Plateau United F.C. players
Olympic medalists in football
Medalists at the 1996 Summer Olympics
Sportspeople from Kaduna